Longdon is a village and civil parish in the District of Lichfield, Staffordshire, England.

Location 
The village is situated midway between the town of Rugeley  and city of Lichfield  . The parish also includes the nearby villages of Upper Longdon, Longdon Green and Gentleshaw.

At the 2001 census, the population of the parish was 1,472. The 2011 census recorded the population of Longdon ward as 1,505.

See also
Listed buildings in Longdon, Staffordshire

References

External links

 Longdon Parish - official site
 Longdon Village Hall Bookings Calendar
 St James the Great, Longdon
 GENUKI: Longdon

Villages in Staffordshire
Civil parishes in Staffordshire